Phosphorus chloride may refer to either of the following:

Phosphorus trichloride, PCl3
Phosphorus pentachloride, PCl5

See phosphorus halides for a complete list of phosphorus halides.